Adrianne Dunnett (-Yeates) (born July 15, 1961) is a Canadian rhythmic gymnast.

Dunnett competed for Canada in the rhythmic gymnastics individual all-around competition at the 1984 Summer Olympics in Los Angeles. There she tied for 17th place in the preliminary (qualification) round and advanced to the final of 20 competitors. In the end she finished in the 17th place overall with a best place finish of 11th in the club event.

References

External links 
 
 

1961 births
Living people
Canadian rhythmic gymnasts
Gymnasts at the 1984 Summer Olympics
Olympic gymnasts of Canada
Gymnasts from Toronto